Ahmet Muhtar Merter, also known as Ahmed Muhtar Bey (1 July 1891, Constantinople – 2 October 1959, Istanbul) was a Turkish soldier, industrialist, sports official and politician.

Sports
Between 1957–1959 Ahmet Muhtar was the President or so called Ağa of the federation that organized the Turkish national sport yağlı güreş (oil wrestling).

Legacy
In Istanbul the suburb Merter is named after him. A picture of him hangs inside the museum of the Anıtkabir. There is also an elementary school in Merter named after him.

References 

1891 births
1959 deaths
Ottoman people of World War I
Turkish people of the Turkish War of Independence